Carex bromoides, known as brome-like sedge, brome-sedge, and dropseed of the woods, is a species of sedge in the genus Carex. It is native to North America.

Taxonomy
Carex bromoides was described by Carl Ludwig Willdenow in 1805. It has two accepted subspecies:
Carex bromoides subsp. bromoides — broadly distributed across eastern North America
Carex bromoides subsp. montana Naczi — restricted to Virginia, North Carolina, and South Carolina

Carex bromoides subsp. montana has larger features including wider culms and leaf blades, as well as proportionately longer perigynium beaks.

Distribution and habitat
Carex bromoides ranges across most of eastern North America, including Mexico, the United States, and Canada. It is found primarily in wooded wetland habitats, occasionally in wet meadows.

References

bromoides